Ludwig Wolff (27 September 1857 – 24 February 1919), born in Neustadt in Palatinate, was a German chemist.

He studied chemistry at the University of Strasbourg, where he received his Ph.D. from Rudolph Fittig in 1882. He became Professor of analytical chemistry at the University of Jena in 1891 and held this position till his death in 1919. In 1911 he published a new reaction now known as the Wolff-Kishner reduction. His name is also associated with the chemical reaction known as the Wolff rearrangement (1912).

References

1857 births
1919 deaths
19th-century German chemists
People from the Rhine Province
University of Strasbourg alumni
Academic staff of the University of Jena
People from Neustadt an der Weinstraße
20th-century German chemists